Nicklas Kulti and Magnus Larsson were the defending champions, but lost in second round to Lan Bale and John-Laffnie de Jager.

Jacco Eltingh and Paul Haarhuis won the title by defeating Luis Lobo and Javier Sánchez 6–3, 6–4 in the final.

Seeds
The top four seeds received a bye into the second round.

Draw

Finals

Top half

Bottom half

References
 Official results archive (ATP)
 Official results archive (ITF)

Doubles